Draven are an English rock band from Guildford, Surrey. Their debut album, Eden, was released in 2008 by Cargo Records and was produced by Kevin Shirley. Eden is a concept album based around the themes of the epic poem Paradise Lost by John Milton. The albums' lead single "Blitz" won a "Future Classic Track" award from Rock Radio and was named "Track of the Day" by Classic Rock Magazine.

Discography

Albums

Singles

Videography
 Itchy Finger (2007)
 Blitz (2011)

Tours and festivals
 Philippines Tour 2005
 Guilfest: 2003 (Stage 3), 2009 (Rocksound Cave Stage), 2010 (Main Stage), 2011 (Main Stage)
 Freakfest 2003, 2004, 2005 2009
 Ripley Rocks: 2010 (Headline), 2011 (Headline)

References

English rock music groups